The men's 110 metres hurdles at the 2017 Asian Athletics Championships was held on 8 July.

Medalists

Results

Heats

Qualification rule: First 2 in each heat (Q) and the next 2 fastest (q) qualified for the final.

Wind:Heat 1: -0.4 m/s, Heat 2: -0.4 m/s, Heat 3: +0.1 m/s

Final

Wind: -0.6 m/s

References

110
Sprint hurdles at the Asian Athletics Championships